Margaret Miller Davidson (March 26, 1823November 25, 1838) was an American poet. Following in the footsteps of her sister Lucretia Maria Davidson, Margaret wrote from a young age, producing a body of poems and a diary. Her work was edited by Washington Irving after her death by tuberculosis at age fifteen.

Professor Walter Harding wrote in the mid-twentieth century that Davidson "was once of the best-known poets in America."

Biography

Margaret Miller Davidson was born March 26, 1823 in Plattsburg, New York. She was the youngest daughter of Oliver and Margaret Davidson. Her sister Lucretia died at age sixteen when Margaret was two years old, and her mother encouraged Margaret's literary development; her mother wrote of Lucretia's death that "on ascending to the skies, it seemed as if her poetic mantle fell like a robe of light on her infant sister." Margaret was tutored by her mother and never sent to school. At age six, she was reading the works of John Milton, Lord Byron, and Walter Scott.

Like her mother and sister Lucretia, Margaret was in frail health from birth. She spent the winter of 1832/1833 visiting a sister in Canada, where she fell ill to scarlet fever. The family moved frequently within New York in search of a healthier environment for the afflictions of the mother and daughter; between 1833 and 1838 they moved to Ballston, to the rural outskirts of New York City, back to Ballston, and then to Saratoga. Throughout her life, Davidson cared for her frequently ill mother and studied languages, philosophy, and history, in addition to writing poems and a diary.

Davidson died November 25, 1838 in Saratoga.

Legacy

Washington Irving wrote Biography and poetical remains of the late Margaret Miller Davidson in 1841; by 1864 the book had twenty editions. Irving described meeting her at age eleven: "There was an intellectual beauty about this child that struck me." Edgar Allan Poe reviewed Davidson's work favorably, describing her longest poem, Lenore, "As the work of so mere a child, it is unquestionably wonderful."

In the 1971 biographical dictionary Notable American Women, scholar Carlin T. Kindilien wrote about the Davidson sisters' contemporary success:

References

External links
 Biography and Poetical Remains of the Late Margaret Miller Davidson (1841) at Google Books
 "Margaret Miller and Lucretia Maria Davidson" by Edgar Allan Poe (1850)
 "Young Davidson sisters famed as poets" (1975 biographical article)

1823 births
1838 deaths
People from Plattsburgh, New York
American women poets
American child writers
19th-century American poets
19th-century American women writers
19th-century deaths from tuberculosis
Tuberculosis deaths in New York (state)
Burials at Greenridge Cemetery